Salim Zanoun (Salim al-Za'nun; 28 December 1933 – 14 December 2022), also known as Abu al-Adib, was a Palestinian politician. He served as the chairman of the Palestinian National Council from 1993. Zanoun was one of the founders of the Fatah party, and remained a member of its central committee.

Zanoun was born in Gaza on 28 December 1933. He began studying law at Cairo University in 1955. He obtained a diploma in law in 1957, and a diploma in politics and economy in 1958. He was elected by general assent to the presidency of the PNC in 1996, at its 21st Session held in Gaza. He assumed the rotating chairmanship of the Arab Parliament at its 16th Congress in March 2010.

Zanoun died on 14 December 2022, at the age of 88.

References

External links

Photograph on The Jordan Times

1933 births
2022 deaths
Central Committee of Fatah members
Fatah members
Palestinian politicians
People from Gaza City